The Shooting of Dan McGrew is an extant 1924 American silent drama film directed by Clarence G. Badger. Distributed by Metro Pictures final film, the film is based on the 1907 poem "The Shooting of Dan McGrew" written by Robert W. Service.

Plot
As described in a film magazine review, the theater troupe of which Lou Lorraine is leading dancer is successful in South  America, but she urges her husband Jim to leave there for the sake of their two-year-old boy named after his father, Jim. One day, a man nicknamed "Dangerous Dan" McGrew offers to put Lou on the New York City stage. He worsts Jim in a fight and Lou runs away with him. She swears on staying faithful to her husband, promising to earn money so Jim and her son can come to New York. Jim takes his son to New York, encounters McGrew, who escapes from him. Lou and McGrew go to Alaska where she becomes a decoy in the Malamute saloon. Jim learns that Lou was duped by her abductor. He follows them to the Klondike, shoots and kills McGrew, and husband, wife, and child are reunited.

Cast

Preservation
A print of The Shooting of Dan McGrew is located in the collection at Gosfilmofond in Moscow.

See also
List of films based on poems

References

External links

Lantern slide at silenthollywood.com

American silent feature films
American black-and-white films
1924 drama films
Films based on poems
Films directed by Clarence G. Badger
Films with screenplays by Barbara La Marr
Silent American drama films
Films based on works by Robert W. Service
Metro Pictures films
1920s American films